Barrington High School may refer to:

 Barrington High School (Illinois), Lake County, Illinois
 Barrington High School (Rhode Island), Barrington, Rhode Island